Firepower (aka  Fire Power) is a 1979 British thriller film directed by Michael Winner and starring Sophia Loren, James Coburn, O. J. Simpson and Eli Wallach. It was the final film in the career of actor Victor Mature. The film was poorly reviewed by critics who objected to its convoluted plot, though the lead performances and filming locations were generally praised.

Plot
In New York City, Adele Tasca (Sophia Loren) is present when her husband is murdered by a letter bomb. She suspects the reclusive billionaire Karl Stegner (George Touliatos), his former employer, of committing the assassination. She learns that her husband, who worked as a chemist, discovered that his employer had made a contaminated drug that resulted in patients contracting cancer. The US government would like to be able to find and bring charges against this mysterious Stegner, who hides his face from the world and his income from the tax department.

FBI agent Frank Hull (Vincent Gardenia) is assigned to the case but does not know how to find Stegner. He decides to use a former secret agent, Sal Hyman (Eli Wallach), to help him. The latter hires Jerry Fannon (James Coburn), a former mafia hitman, for a million dollars, and sends him to Antigua. Sal thinks Jerry is the only man likely to infiltrate the network that protects Stegner.

His right-hand man, Catlett (O. J. Simpson) is killed by Leo Gelhorn (George Grizzard) on the island, but with the help of the beautiful Adele, who wants revenge, Jerry succeeds in tracking down Stegner, before realizing that he actually captured Stegner's double, who was the victim of an attack by Stegner's men. Jerry returns to the island where Stegner is hiding. The mysterious Dr. Felix (Anthony Franciosa) is really Stegner.

After disposing of the vehicles and the helicopter of Dr. Felix, Jerry enters the house with a bulldozer. He takes Felix prisoner and leaves with him and Adele, pursued by Stegner's bodyguards. As they prepare to leave the island by seaplane, Adele turns a gun on Jerry. Felix takes his weapon, but when he fires at Jerry, Adele turns away. Jerry finally takes off with Dr. Felix to be brought to justice.

A little later, Adele is introduced to Harold Everett (Victor Mature), another billionaire who she sets her eyes on, as her next conquest.

Cast

 Sophia Loren as Adele Tasca
 James Coburn as Jerry Fanon/Eddie
 O. J. Simpson as Catlett
 Eli Wallach as Sal Hyman
 Anthony Franciosa as Dr. Charles Felix
 George Grizzard as Leo Gelhorn
 Vincent Gardenia as Frank Hull
 Victor Mature as Harold Everett
 Jake LaMotta as Nickel Sam
 Hank Garrett as Oscar Bailey
 George Touliatos as Karl Stegner
 Conrad Roberts as Lestor Wallace
 Billy Barty as Dominic Carbone
 Vincent Beck as Trilling
 Dominic Chianese as Orlov
 Andrew Duncan as Del Cooper
 Paul D'Amato as Tagua

Production
Firepower started as a Dirty Harry film written by Bill Kerby. It was considerably rewritten. In 1977 O. J. Simpson mentioned one of his upcoming projects was Fire Power for producer Carlo Ponti with Terence Hill.

Sophia Loren was cast at a reported fee of $1 million.

According to director Michael Winner, producer Lew Grade had fully expected Charles Bronson to co-star with Loren. With much of the pre-production crew already on location in the Caribbean (Saint Lucia), Grade wanted to shut down the production when Bronson pulled out. Realizing how much money he had already sunk into a film that had not properly secured its star actors, Grade saved face by moving ahead and using James Coburn as a replacement for Bronson.

Coburn said "I did it for the money, the locations (the Caribbean islands) and 
to work with Sophia Loren. The director was Michael Winner. He’s probably one of the weirdest guys I’ve ever met. Yet, I thought he was a good guy when I first met him. But when he got on the set, he was almost like a total dictator. I found it hard to 
work for that way. The most fun I had was when I got to drive a bulldozer through a 
house in the islands (laughs).” 

Winner says the millionaire character was based on Howard Hughes and Robert Vesco.

Firepower was filmed in Curaçao, Saint Lucia, Antigua, Brooklyn, New Jersey, New York, Miami, Florida, and Key Largo, Florida. Bridgeport, Connecticut.

Victor Mature makes a cameo at the request of director Michael Winner, who wanted someone instantly recognisable for the role of the one of the richest people in the world. "I worked for eight hours on one scene," he laughed.

Winner says he "resented" having O. J. Simpson imposed on him but "now I am happy he was given to me because what he lacks in experience he makes up with in charisma." Simpson said "there were times on this movie, I didn't feel comfortable. I needed a little more attention from the director to establish my character."

Reception
Firepower was an early release from AFD, a new distribution company set up by Lew Grade in association with EMI to distribute their films in the US.

Critical
Firepower was negatively received by most critics due to a convoluted plot, though the locations and chemistry between the leading players was generally appreciated. Janet Maslin of The New York Times wrote: "Mr. Winner directs movies the way others toss salads, which means that “Firepower” is best appreciated at a kind of mental half‐mast. A lot happens. None of it makes sense". She further added: "Some of the performances Mr. Winner gets from his supporting players are rip‐roaringly awful, as is Gato Barbieri's loud and schlocky score. However, there's a nice chemistry in the teaming of Miss Loren, Mr. Coburn and Mr. Simpson, each of whom has an unusually physical presence on the screen."

Author John Howard Reid concurred that the plot was too convoluted, stating that the film has "enough plot twists and action sequences for a dozen movies". He approved of the performances, but expressed disappointment that Victor Mature barely had any screen time and was not central to the plot and that Coburn's double role wasn't used to better effect.

The review in Variety noted: "If the story becomes too tough or tiresome to follow, or the action grows tepid and repetitive, there’s always the beautiful scenery of the glamorous Caribbean locales."

References

Notes

Citations

Bibliography

 Halliwell, Leslie. Leslie Halliwell's Film Guide. New York: Harper & Roe, 1989. .
 Reid, John Howard. Classic Movies: The Best and the Worst Pictures to see! Films to avoid! Morrisville, North Carolina: Lulu.com. (Reid Books), 2015. .
 Winner, Michael. Winner Takes All: A Life of Sorts. London: Robson Books, 2004. .

External links
 
Firepower at Letterbox DVD
 
 

1979 films
1970s action thriller films 
1970s heist films
British aviation films
British action thriller films 
British heist films
Films about kidnapping
Films directed by Michael Winner
Films set in the Caribbean
Films shot in Connecticut
Films shot in Curaçao
Films shot in Miami
Films shot in New Jersey
Films shot in New York City
Films shot in Saint Lucia
ITC Entertainment films
Cockfighting in film
Films with screenplays by Michael Winner
Films about the Federal Bureau of Investigation
Films produced by Michael Winner
1970s English-language films
1970s American films
1970s British films